Bombs Away is an Australian DJ vocal and producer duo consisting of Matthew and Thomas Coleman. They are best known for their top 40 2012 single "Party Bass".

Career
Matthew and Thomas Coleman were born on the Gold Coast, Australia, before relocating to Perth early in their adult lives. They released their debut single "Big Booty Bitches" in 2010. The song reached number 3 on the Beatport Electro Top 100. and has been viewed more than 3 million times on YouTube, The song was certified gold in 2013. Their follow-up single "Swagger" was released in early 2011 and received national airplay on the Nova Network and the Today Network.

Bombs Away's third single "Super Soaker" was released in September 2011 and was certified platinum in 2012. In March 2012, they released a collaboration with DJ Kronic, titled "Looking for Some Girls", which reached number 7 on the ARIA Club Chart. Bombs Away's fifth single, "Get Stoopid", a collaboration with Seany B (the performer of the TV Rock single "Flaunt It"), was released in late 2012, and reached number 1 on the ARIA Club Chart and was ranked number 27 in the Top 50 Club Tracks of 2012 on the ARIA Charts. The majority of the film clip for "Get Stoopid" was filmed on the streets of Surfers Paradise, and featured cameo appearances from The Twins and DJ Kronic. 

"Party Bass" was released in 2012 and peaked at number 25 on the ARIA Charts and was certified platinum. At the ARIA Music Awards of 2013, the song was nominated for ARIA Award for Song of the Year.
"Drunk Arcade" debuted at number 15 on the ARIA Dance Singles Chart. The duo's original release "Assassinate", released in July 2013, reached number 4 on the Beatport Electro Release chart on 1 August.

In June 2018 Bombs Away released their debut studio album, Fragments, which included the singles "Like You", "Let You Down", "Before We Had a Label" and "Drive Me Home".

In July 2021, group member Matthew "Sketch" Coleman, announced his departure from the duo, announcing that he was departing from centre stage within the Australian music industry as a touring artist. However Sketch announced he is not entirely leaving the music industry, but instead further focusing on ventures in event management, the most known being the Schoolies end of year festivals on the Gold Coast.

Discography

Albums

Extended Play

Singles

Notes

References

External links
 Official Bombs Away website

Australian electronic musicians
2010 establishments in Australia
Musical groups established in 2010
Australian house music groups
Musical groups from Perth, Western Australia
Queensland musical groups
Musicians from Gold Coast, Queensland
House musicians